La is a genus of moths of the family Crambidae described by Stanisław Błeszyński in 1966.  There are four species in the genus, three of which have been given punning names.

Species

References

Crambini
Crambidae genera
Taxa named by Stanisław Błeszyński